The Indian actor, director and producer Dev Anand participated in the following motion-pictures:

Filmography

Notes

References 

https://www.thequint.com/entertainment/dev-anand-zeenat-aman-hare-rama-hare-krishna-sequel-planned-birth-anniversary

Bibliography 
 

Indian filmographies
Male actor filmographies
Director filmographies